The East Mikwam River is a tributary of the Mikwam River, flowing into the Cochrane District, in the north-east of Ontario, in Canada.

Forestry is the main economic activity of the sector; recreational tourism activities, second. The west side of this slope is served by Ontario road 652.

The surface of the river is usually frozen from early November to mid-May, however, safe ice movement is generally from mid-November to the end of April.

Geography 
The adjacent hydrographic slopes of the East Mikwam River are:
North side: Mikwam River, Burntbush River, Lawagamau River;
East side: Tomlinson Creek, Kakika River, Burntbush River, Porphyry Creek;
South side: Seguin River, Kenning River, Kabika River;
West side: Mikwam River, South Floodwood River, Floodwood River, Little Abitibi River.

The East Mikwam River originates from a mountain stream.

From its source, the East Mikwam River flows on  according to the following segments:
 northwesterly, in Kenning Township, to the southern limit of Tomlinson Township;
 northwesterly in Tomlinson Township to the easterly limit of Newman Township;
 westward in Newman Township, then north to mouth.

Toponymy 
The following names are of the same origin and are in the same area of the Cochrane District: Mikwam River, Little Mikwam River, East Mikwam River, Mikwam Lake, Little Mikwam Lake and Upper Mikwam Lake.

See also 

Mikwam River, a watercourse
Burntbush River, a watercourse
Turgeon River, a watercourse
Harricana River, a watercourse
James Bay
Cochrane District (Ontario)
List of rivers of Ontario

References

External links 

East Mikwam